Fabci is a small settlement in the hills southeast of Ilirska Bistrica in the Inner Carniola region of Slovenia, close to the border with Croatia.

Unmarked graves
Fabci is the site of two unmarked graves from the end of the Second World War. The Church Grave is located behind the church. It contains the remains of a Croatian farmhand from Grobnik named Matija, who was shot by German troops while fleeing. It contains the remains of a German soldier from the 97th Corps that was killed at the beginning of May 1945.

References

External links
Fabci on Geopedia

Populated places in the Municipality of Ilirska Bistrica